Ken Duncum is a New Zealand playwright and screenwriter. His plays Cherish and Trick of the Light won best new New Zealand play at the Chapman Tripp Theatre Awards in 2003 and 2004. His script for television drama series Cover Story won Best Script for Drama at the New Zealand Film and Television Awards and Best Writer - Comedy for Willy Nilly in 2002. Duncum's plays have toured New Zealand as well as internationally. He was awarded the New Zealand Post Katherine Mansfield Prize for 2010. The prize is NZ$100,000 for a writing residency in France.

Duncum was born in Napier and studied film, theatre and television at Victoria University of Wellington.

Plays
Blue Sky Boys
Cherish (published 2004 by Victoria University Press)
Flipside
Flybaby
Horseplay
Jism
Panic!
Picture Perfect
Polythene Pam
The Great Gatsby
The Temptations of St Max
Trick of the Light (2002), in which two adult Pākehā children grieve their dead mother by returning to a motel that was important in her life.
Waterloo Sunset

Television series
Willy Nilly

References

External links
Playmarket, New Zealand Playwrights' Agency

Living people
21st-century New Zealand dramatists and playwrights
Year of birth missing (living people)
Victoria University of Wellington alumni
People from Napier, New Zealand
New Zealand television writers
21st-century New Zealand male writers
New Zealand male dramatists and playwrights
21st-century screenwriters